Yingfeng Temple is a Buddhist temple located in Yingjiang District of Anqing, Anhui, China.

History

Song dynasty
The temple was first built in 974, under Emperor Taizu (960–976) rule in the recently founded Song dynasty (960–1279).

Ming dynasty
In 1619, in the reign of Wanli Emperor (1573–1620) of the Ming dynasty (1368–1644), Ruan Zihua, a local gentleman, rebuilt the temple. In the following year, Emperor Guangzong (1620) inscribed and honored the name "Huguo Yongchang Chan Temple".

Qing dynasty and Republic of China
A war left the temple in ruins in 1861, in the ruling of Xianfeng Emperor (1851–1861) in the Qing dynasty (1644–1911). It was restored and renamed "Yingjiang Temple" in 1862, in the 1st year of Tongzhi period (1862–1874). Sixteen years later, master Yuexia was proposed as the new abbot of Yingjiang Temple. He was dismissed after voicing his strong opposition to the restoration of monarchy by Yuan Shikai in 1916. His disciple Xinjian succeeded the position.

People's Republic of China
After the establishment of the Communist State in 1949, the Anhui Provincial Government provided great protection for the temple.

After the 3rd Plenary Session of the 11th Central Committee of the Chinese Communist Party, according to the national policy of free religious belief, the administrative power was transferred to the local Buddhist association.

Yingjiang Temple has been designated as a National Key Buddhist Temple in Han Chinese Area by the State Council of China in 1983.

Architecture

Now the existing main buildings include Shanmen, Heavenly Kings Hall, Mahavira Hall, Pilu Hall, Buddhist Texts Library and Zhenfeng Pagoda.

Heavenly Kings Hall
The statues of Maitreya Buddha, Skanda and Four Heavenly Kings are enshrined in the Hall of Four Heavenly Kings.

Mahavira Hall
The Mahavira Hall is the main hall in the temple. Statues of Sakyamuni, Amitabha and Bhaisajyaguru are placed in the middle of the hall. Statues of Manjushri and Samantabhadra are placed at the back. And the statues of Eighteen Arhats sitting on the seats before both sides of the gable walls.

Pilu Hall
The Pilu Hall enshrining the statues of Vairocana, Brahma and Indra. At the back are statues of Guanyin with Shancai standing on the left and Longnü on the right.

Buddhist Texts Library
It is divided into three storeys. Statues of the Three Sages of the West, namely Guanyin, Amitabha and Mahasthamaprapta, are enshrined in the middle storey.

Zhenfeng Pagoda

The Zhenfeng Pagoda was originally built in the Song dynasty (960–1279) and reconstructed in 1570 in the reign of Longqing Emperor (1567–1572) of the Ming dynasty (1368–1644). It initially called "Ten Thousand Buddha Pagoda". The  pagoda has the brick-and-wood structure with seven storeys and eight sides. Curved bars and cornices are set on each story, which are magnificent and become the symbol of Yingjiang Temple. Over 1,200 statues of Buddha are enshrined in its interior.

References

Buddhist temples in Anqing
Tourist attractions in Anqing
19th-century establishments in China
19th-century Buddhist temples
Religious buildings and structures completed in 1862
Linji school temples